American country signer Connie Smith has released 39 studio albums, one live album, 15 compilation albums, three box sets, and has made numerous appearances on various other albums. This page lists every song recorded by Smith that has been commercially released.

Released songs

Notes

References

Smith, Connie
Songs